Fopp is the second EP by the American rock band Soundgarden, released in August 1988 through Sub Pop Records. Fopp was later combined with the band's first EP, Screaming Life (1987), and released as the Screaming Life/Fopp compilation album in 1990.

Recording
The EP was recorded in 1988 at the Moore Theatre in Seattle, Washington, with producer Steve Fisk.

Music and lyrics
The EP contains one Soundgarden original, two covers, and a remix. Guitarist Kim Thayil said of the title track: "That's an Ohio Players song off of Honey—I've had that album since I was in high school. We thought we could take the song and make it AC/DC or something. We'd take the power chords, turn up the volume and make it heavy. "Fopp" is a good song that needed to be given its due as a "kick-ass rock song!" The EP also contains a cover of the Green River song "Swallow My Pride" from the 1985 EP, Come on Down.

Release and reception
Fopp was released on vinyl only, packaged in black die-cut sleeves and limited to 3,000 copies. The album's cover art was photographed by Charles Peterson. Frontman Chris Cornell said, "The second record did pretty well but it wasn't like a sweep, some people didn't like it."

Track listing

Personnel
Soundgarden
Matt Cameron –  drums
Chris Cornell –  lead vocals 
Kim Thayil –  guitar 
Hiro Yamamoto –  bass

Production
Drew Canulette –  engineering
Steve Fisk –  production

Management
Susan Silver Management – management

References

1988 EPs
Soundgarden EPs
Albums produced by Steve Fisk
Albums recorded at the Moore Theatre
Sub Pop EPs